Past Lives is a 2023 American romantic drama film written and directed by Celine Song in her feature directorial debut. The film stars Greta Lee, Teo Yoo and John Magaro, and follows a reunion between two childhood friends as they contemplate their relationship and their own lives.

The film had its world premiere at the Sundance Film Festival on January 21, 2023. It is scheduled to be released on June 2, 2023, by A24.

Cast
 Greta Lee as Nora
 Seung Ah Moon as young Nora
 Teo Yoo as Hae Sung
 Seung Min Yim as young Hae Sung
 John Magaro as Arthur
 Ji Hye Yoon as Nora's mom
 Choi Won-young as Nora's dad
 Min Young Ahn as Hae Sung's mom
 Jonica T. Gibbs as Janice
 Emily Cass McDonnell as Rachel
 Federico Rodriguez as Robert
 Conrad Schott as Peter
 Kristen Sieh as Heather

Production
In January 2020, it was announced Choi Woo-shik would star in the film, with Celine Song set to direct from a screenplay she wrote, with A24 set to produce and distribute alongside Killer Films and CJ ENM. In August 2021, Greta Lee, Teo Yoo, and John Magaro joined the cast of the film, with Yoo replacing Woo-sik.

Release
It had its world premiere at the 2023 Sundance Film Festival on January 21, 2023. It was also screened at 73rd Berlin International Film Festival on February 19, 2023. It is scheduled to be released on June 2, 2023.

Reception 
On review aggregator website Rotten Tomatoes, the film has an approval rating of 97% based on 35 reviews, with an average rating of 8.7/10. The critics consensus says "A remarkable debut for writer-director Celine Song, Past Lives uses the bonds between its sensitively sketched central characters to support trenchant observations on the human condition." On Metacritic, the film has a weighted average of 95 out of 100 based on 14 critic reviews, indicating "universal acclaim".

References

External links
 
 

2023 films
2023 directorial debut films
2023 independent films
2023 romantic drama films
2020s American films
2020s English-language films
A24 (company) films
American independent films
American romantic drama films
Films produced by Christine Vachon
Killer Films films